Keita Baldé Diao (born 8 March 1995) is a Senegalese professional footballer who plays as a winger for Russian club Spartak Moscow. Born in Spain, he decided to represent Senegal – his parents' country of origin – at international level.

Club career

Early career
Born in Arbúcies, Girona, Catalonia, to Senegalese parents, Keita came up through the FC Barcelona's youth academy. In 2010, Keita travelled with the Barcelona youth team to Qatar for a tournament, where he played a practical joke by placing an ice-cube in a teammate's bed; As a punishment, Barcelona sent the 15-year-old Keita on loan to satellite club UE Cornellà, despite his reputation as a future prospect for the first team. The loan meant Cornellà held the rights to a fraction of Keita's playing rights. After a season in which he scored 47 goals for Cornellà's youth side, Keita turned down the chance to return to Barcelona, attracting the interest of Real Madrid and Manchester United.

Lazio
In the summer of 2011, Keita was signed by Serie A club Lazio for a €300,000 transfer fee, of which 10% went to Cornellà. Keita was unable to play official matches for Lazio's youth sides for a year, as he had to wait to be granted Spanish citizenship and the EU passport required for the Italian club to register him. However, he impressed while playing in the Torneo Karol Wojtyla youth competition, where he scored six goals in just four matches.

Keita then spent the 2012–13 season playing with Lazio's Primavera youth side and training with the first team. He was selected by head coach Vladimir Petković to sit on the bench for some matches in the latter part of the season but did not make his senior debut.

Promoted to the first team for the following season, Keita made his league debut in a 3–0 home win against Chievo at the Stadio Olimpico on 15 September 2013, coming on as a late substitute for Luis Pedro Cavanda. Five days later, Keita made his debut in the Europa League group stage match against Legia Warsaw, starting and providing the match's only goal scored by Hernanes. On 10 November 2013, he scored his first senior goal in a 1–1 draw against Parma.

On 18 August 2015, Keita came off the bench to score the only goal of the game as Lazio beat Bayer Leverkusen 1–0 in the first leg of their Champions League play-off at the Stadio Olimpico.

Keita fully established himself in the starting lineup in the 2016–17 season, scoring his first goal of the season in Serie A matchday 6 against Empoli at home. On 6 March of the following year, Keita made his 100th Serie A appearance in the 2–0 win at Bologna. Later on 23 April, Keita scored his maiden hat-trick, contributing in Lazio's 6–2 thrashing of Palermo, taking his tally up to 11 goals, reaching double figures for the first time in his career. He completed the hat-trick in five minutes, making it the fastest hat-trick scored in Serie A since 1974–75 season. One week later, in the Derby della Capitale against Roma for the matchday 34, Keita scored a brace, as Lazio won 3–1, the first win in the league against them since November 2012. He also become the first Lazio player to score a brace in the derby since Roberto Mancini in 1998–99 season.

Monaco
On 29 August 2017, Keita joined Monaco on a five-year contract for a reported €30 million transfer fee. He was assigned the number 14 shirt vacated by Tiémoué Bakayoko, who left for Chelsea earlier that summer.
 On 21 October 2017, Keita opened the scoring in the 2–0 Ligue 1 home win over Caen to register his first competitive Monaco goal after playing seven matches in all competitions for the club.

Loan to Inter Milan
On 13 August 2018, Keita signed for Inter Milan on loan of €6 million with a €30 million option to buy at the end of the season. He made his Serie A debut for the club on the first matchday of the 2018–19 season, in a loss to Sassuolo. On 24 November, he scored his first goals for the Nerazzurri; a brace in a 3–0 win over Frosinone. While not making many appearances, he found his way to the net again on 3 December in the away match against Roma, which ended 2–2. On 29 December, he scored the 1–0 winner over Empoli in the 72nd minute off a pass from Šime Vrsaljko. During the second half of the season he scored one goal, also against Empoli, on 26 May 2019, the opening goal in a 2–1 win for Inter Milan. At the end of the season, Baldé returned to Monaco as Inter did not trigger the buyout clause.

Loan to Sampdoria
On 29 September 2020, Keita joined Sampdoria on loan until 30 June 2021. On 23 December, after being sidelined for almost two months due to an injury, he scored his first goal for Sampdoria in his fourth appearance, in the 2–3 home defeat against Sassuolo, a game in which he was also sent off.

Cagliari 
On 31 August 2021, Keita joined then-Serie A side Cagliari, where he played for one season.

Spartak Moscow
On 26 August 2022, Keita signed a three-year contract with Russian Premier League club Spartak Moscow. He made his debut on on 4 September in a 1–2 loss to Zenit Saint Petersburg.

On 17 September 2022, it was announced that the Italian Anti-Doping Organization concluded an investigation into Balde's actions from the time he was playing for Cagliari and banned him from playing until 5 December 2022 for violating testing procedures, despite no banned substances being found. Spartak announced it would comply with the decision taken in Italy.

International career
Keita was born in Spain to Senegalese parents. Although he was eligible to play for Spain, he chose to play for his parents' country, Senegal, being called up by their manager, Aliou Cissé, for the match against Niger for 2017 Africa Cup of Nations qualification Group K. He made his debut for Senegal on 26 March 2016, in a 2–0 win over Niger as a late substitute. He also played a friendly match with the Catalonia national team in December 2015 against Basque Country.

In May 2018, Keita was named in Senegal's 23-man squad for the 2018 FIFA World Cup in Russia.

Personal life
His younger brother Ibourahima Baldé is also a football player.

As a child, Keita supported Inter Milan and has credited Samuel Eto'o for being his childhood idol.

Career statistics

Club

International

Scores and results list Senegal's goal tally first, score column indicates score after each Keita goal.

Honours
Senegal
Africa Cup of Nations: 2021; runner-up: 2019

Individual
Serie A Goal of the Month: November 2021

References

1995 births
Living people
People from Selva
Sportspeople from the Province of Girona
Citizens of Senegal through descent
Senegalese footballers
Senegal international footballers
Spanish footballers
Footballers from Catalonia
Association football forwards
CF Damm players
UE Cornellà players
FC Barcelona players
S.S. Lazio players
AS Monaco FC players
Inter Milan players
U.C. Sampdoria players
Cagliari Calcio players
FC Spartak Moscow players
Serie A players
Ligue 1 players
Russian Premier League players
Spanish people of Senegalese descent
Spanish sportspeople of African descent
Spanish expatriate footballers
Senegalese expatriate footballers
Expatriate footballers in Italy
Spanish expatriate sportspeople in Italy
Senegalese expatriate sportspeople in Italy
Expatriate footballers in Monaco
Spanish expatriate sportspeople in Monaco
Senegalese expatriate sportspeople in Monaco
Expatriate footballers in Russia
Spanish expatriate sportspeople in Russia
Senegalese expatriate sportspeople in Russia
Catalonia international footballers
2017 Africa Cup of Nations players
2018 FIFA World Cup players
2019 Africa Cup of Nations players
2021 Africa Cup of Nations players
Africa Cup of Nations-winning players